Alan or Allan Anderson may refer to:

Alan Anderson (basketball) (born 1982), basketball player
Alan Anderson (British public servant) (1877–1952), public servant and shipowner
Alan Anderson (footballer) (1939–2022), Scottish former professional footballer
Alan Orr Anderson (1879–1958), Scottish historian
Alan Paul Anderson (born 1961), American commissioner for the Federal Maritime Commission
Alan Ross Anderson (1925–1973), American logician
Allan Anderson (baseball) (born 1964), American baseball player
Allan Anderson (cricketer) (born 1949), Australian cricketer
Allan Anderson (footballer) (1944–2013), Australian rules footballer
Allan Anderson (theologian) (born 1949), Anglo-Zimbabwean theologian
Allan Cunningham Anderson (1896–1986), Canadian newspaperman and diplomat

See also
Al Anderson (disambiguation)